Wings Across America 2008 (WAA-08) was a group of model airplane enthusiasts that flew a battery-powered radio-controlled aircraft (RC), designated as a park flyer, in all 48 contiguous United States with hopes to make all 50, if Alaska and Hawaii could be reached.  A park flyer is a small radio-controlled plane typically flown in a field such as a local park or soccer field.

History

Wings Across America 2008 (WAA-08) was the creation of Frank Geisler of Gloucester, Virginia.  Frank is an avid RC pilot, USAF veteran and AMA contest director who volunteers his free time to help promote the sport/hobby of radio controlled flying.  When Frank discussed this project with some of his friends, it was received with such enthusiasm that the project was born of this energy.  All that was needed was to find hundreds of RC pilots across the US in every state willing to fly the plane at their home field and then drive to the next pilot, thus forming a nationwide network of pilots who would fly across America.

Frank used the internet RC forums and emailed Academy of Model Aeronautics chartered clubs in search of volunteers willing to help the project come to fruition. In only 5 weeks from inception, 230 pilots had joined, representing all 48 continental United States.

This type of project had been attempted before.  What sets this project apart from all the others ever attempted or completed was that the pilots hand delivered the plane from pilot to pilot; the plane was never shipped by mail to its next destination.  In this way a "chain" was created of pilots that personally flew the model, then handed it off to the next pilot, all across the continental United States.  In the end, the model airplane flew in all 48 states and covered a distance of over 30,000 miles.The WAA-08 Pilots MapThe WAA-08 Completed Pilots Map

It ended its journey at the home field in eastern Virginia 5 years, 145 days, 21 hours and 50 minutes  after it made its maiden flight. Over 340 RC pilots registered to take part in this history making project. 248 Academy of Model Aeronautics (AMA) Chartered clubs hosted the adventure.

All the equipment used for the WAA-08 was donated by the participating pilots.  Fortunately, one of the pilots was Bill Stevens, owner of Stevens AeroModels in Colorado Springs, CO.  Bill donated a plane called the SQuiRT which stands for Simple, Quiet, Robust, Trainer.  This tough little parkflyer was easy to fly and could take the abuse that over 340 pilots would dish out.  With Bill's help, Horizon Hobby agreed to donate their newest high-tech radio control system to go along with the plane.

The goal of this event was to help promote model aviation.

 The routing of the plane is handled by Frank Geisler, who e-mails the pilots when they are scheduled to meet the previous pilot of the plane and then fly it themselves.

 On May 24, 2008, Frank launched the first flight.

The Wings Across America 2008 adventure is over, but its legacy is living on at the National Model Aviation Museum.  Use the link to reference WAA-08's outstanding museum display, Pilot's Log Book entries, and more info about the adventure.

WAA-08 Statistics (Current as of 11 Oct 13)

26,587 miles traveled
812 pilots have flown the WAA-08 plane
230 AMA Chartered clubs visited
48 states visited
333 registered pilots
29 registered pilots in California (the most, followed by NY with 22)
1 registered pilot in Delaware and Vermont
0 degrees –Coldest temperature that the WAA-08 plane was flown: Richard C (#263) Butte, MT.
107 degrees –Hottest temperature that the WAA-08 plane was flown: Mike H (#127) Valley Mills, TX
8,500' – Highest altitude flown by the SQuiRT by pilots Rod B (180) & John C (180a) of Dillon, CO.
12,000+ emails sent in support of the WAA-08 adventure
4,500+ posts on the online RC Forums in support of the WAA-08 adventure
112,490 hits on our WAA-08 Google Maps page
205 pages of notes taken recording my personal experiences and important events of the WAA-08 adventure

Major Events Attended

Kitty Hawk, NC 17 Aug 2013
The Joe Nall 11–18 May 2013
Southeast Electric Flight Festival (SEFF) 22–28 April 2013
National Electric Fly In (NEFI) 11 Jun 2011
Western States Electric Fun Fly (WSEFF) 4–6 June 2010
Dallas Electric Aircraft Fliers (DEAF 23) 27–28 September 2009
Southeast Electric Flight Festival (SEFF) 1–3 May 2009
Northeast Electric Aircraft Technology (NEAT) 12–14 September 2008

The oldest and youngest pilots

Youngest Female: Nicole Hansen 8
Youngest Male: Evan Holman 6
Oldest Female: Carol Bershers 68. Marva Clingaman also admits she is at least 68.
Oldest Male: Bill Baily: 97

Club with the most WAA-08-pilots

Hampton Roads R/C Club (53) coordinated by Sam Verlander pilot #404
Tri-County R/C Club (30) Coordinated by Scott Saxon pilot #398
Monroe County RC Club (23) Coordinated by Mike Friesel pilot #359
Tarheel R/C Flyer (22) Coordinated by Mike Then pilot #397
Toledo Weak Signals (17) Coordinated by Charles Hainy pilot #346
Prop Floppers (15) Coordinated by Kent Clingaman pilot #347
Hawks R/C Junior Aviators (10) Coordinated by Tim Pease pilot #64
South Bend Radio Control Club (10) Coordinated by Terry Rensberger pilot#339

Most flights in a single day
69 on 31 August 2013

News Coverage

33 Online news stories
30 Local papers
6 nationally publicized magazines have run articles on the WAA-08 adventure
6 Local television news broadcasts
1 Local radio show
1 Parade (Logan County Fair Parade)
1 Weekly RC Podcast that provides WAA-08 updates

Forum Members

135 on RC Groups
33 on WattFlyer
2 on RC Universe
2 on Flying Giants

Plane statistics

Plane: Simple Quiet Robust Trainer (SQuiRT)
Wingspan: 38"
Motor: GWS sp400 (1st one replaced after 215 flights)
ESC: Spectrum 18 Amp from Medusa Research
Batteries: MaxAmps 1100 mAH 7.4V 25C LiPos
Props: GWS 7x3.5
Receiver: Spektrum AR6100e
Servos: 2 Ea Hitec HS-55
Radio: Spektrum DX6i
Battery Charger: Cellpro 4s from FMA Direct
AUW: 16 ounces
Built from: Balsa and vinyl covering
Manufacturer: Stevens AeroModel
Year Built: 2008

Sponsors

Stevens AeroModel
Horizon Hobby
Redneck RC
SuperFly RC (Tram)
Big Al's Hobby Supply
RC Pro Racing
MaxAmps
Hobby Hangar
Castle Creations
Grumpy Monkey Designs
E Cubed R/C
FliteLine Hobbies
R/C FlightCast
Vinyl For RC
Medusa Research Inc.
Nico Hobbies
Al's Bicycles and Hobbies
Steve Cranford (WAA-08.org Domain creator)
Desert Eagles Model Airplane Flying Club

Gallery

 
"Doolittle Raid" Memorial Celebration,'' the SQuiRT pays tribute in Columbia, SC. Flown by "Wings Across America 2008 (WAA-08)" pilot Jerry Branch on 3/12/2009.

''Dallas Electric Aircraft Fliers (DEAF 23)''  September 27–28, 2009 Dallas, Texas

 

Southeast Electric Flight Festival (SEFF) May 1–3, 2009  Andersonville, Georgia

Northeast Electric Aircraft Technology (NEAT) September 12–14, 2008  Downsville, New York. Western States Electric Fly June 11, 2010

Academy of Model Aeronautics (AMA)
Founded in 1936, the Academy of Model Aeronautics (AMA) is the world's largest sport aviation organization, representing a membership of more than 150,000 for the purpose of promotion, development, education, advancement, and safeguarding of modeling activities. AMA is the voice of its membership, providing liaison with the Federal Aviation Administration, the Federal Communications Commission and other government agencies.  AMA also works with local governments, zoning boards, and parks departments to promote the interests of local chartered clubs. AMA seeks to introduce young men and women to the art and craft of aeromodeling. Through an active educational outreach program, AMA supports teachers and community-based organizations who wish to infuse topics in math, science, and technology with aviation activities. (www.modelaircraft.org or call 800-435-9262)

Online Web Pages
The following sites published articles on the WAA-08 Wings Across America adventure

Aero News 
EAA Young Eagles 
Derry News (Pilot #45)
The Valley News (Pilot #64) 
The Jackson Herald (Pilot #84) 
WLTX.com (Pilot #92) 
The Joplin Globe (Pilot #144) 
Mt. Shasta News (Pilot #244) 
Woodburn Independent""" (Pilot #248) The Outlook (Pilot #250) The News Tribune (Pilot #259/260) Tri-City Herald (Pilot #259/260) WGHP Fox8' (Pilot #395/395) 

Published ArticlesJackson Herald newspaper, Ripley, WV December 30, 2008 Columbia WLTX TV & newspaper, Columbia, SC  March 12, 2009 Joplin Globe newspaper, Joplin, MO August 7, 2009 Backyard Flyer magazine, June 28, 2009 FlyRC" magazine'' July 2010 issue #80

References

External links 
 
 Academy of Model Aeronautics AMA Article on WAA-08
 Aero News Net
 EAA Young Eagles Article on WAA-08
 The Valley News Chronicle
 Pike County Courier
 Back Yard Flyer magazine article
 Western States Electric Fly
 WGHP 8 News Article and Video

Radio-controlled aircraft
Model aircraft